Abduaziz Mahkamov (born 15 July 1987), is a former Tajikistani footballer who played as a goalkeeper. Mahkamov was banned for life from playing football in August 2019.

Career

Club
During March 2016, Mahkamov moved from FK Khujand to Kyrgyzstan League Champions Alay Osh.
On 2 August 2019, the Asian Football Confederation announced that Mahkamov had been banned for life for his involvement in a conspiracy to manipulate matches during Alay Osh's 2017 AFC Cup and 2018 AFC Cup campaign.

International
Mahkamov made his debut for Tajikistan national team on 7 June 2016, in a 1–0 victory over Bangladesh.

Career statistics

International

Statistics accurate as of match played 27 March 2018

References

1987 births
Living people
Tajikistan international footballers
Tajikistani footballers
Association football goalkeepers
Tajikistan Higher League players
Place of birth missing (living people)
Footballers at the 2006 Asian Games
Asian Games competitors for Tajikistan